In astronomy, a regular moon is a natural satellite following a relatively close and prograde orbit with little orbital inclination or eccentricity. They are believed to have formed in orbit about their primary, as opposed to irregular moons, which were captured.

There are at least 57 regular satellites of the eight planets: one at Earth, eight at Jupiter, 23 named regular moons at Saturn (not counting hundreds or thousands of moonlets), 18 known at Uranus, and 7 small regular moons at Neptune (Neptune's largest moon Triton appears to have been captured). It is thought that Pluto's five moons and Haumea's two were formed in orbit about those dwarf planets out of debris created in giant collisions.

Most regular moons are known to be tidally locked to their parent planet; the one known exception is Saturn's Hyperion, which exhibits chaotic rotation.

See also
Irregular moon
Inner moon

Moons